Wilfrid Mantin Cline (September 3, 1903 – April 9, 1976) was an American cinematographer. He was nominated for an Academy Award in the category Best Color Cinematography for the film Aloma of the South Seas, in which he shared with Karl Struss and William E. Snyder. He also was nominated for an Primetime Emmy Award  in the category Outstanding Special and Visual Effects for his work on the television program My World and Welcome to It. Cline died in April 1976 in Balboa Island, California, at the age of 72. He was buried in Pacific View Memorial Park.

Selected filmography 
 Aloma of the South Seas (1941; co-nominated with Karl Struss and William E. Snyder)

References

External links 

1903 births
1976 deaths
People from Los Angeles
American cinematographers
Burials at Pacific View Memorial Park